Marek Šindler (born 21 July 1992 in Opava) is a Czech slalom canoeist who has competed at the international level since 2007.

He won two medals in the C2 team event at the ICF Canoe Slalom World Championships with a gold in 2013 and a bronze in 2014. He also won one gold, three silvers and three bronzes at the European Championships. He finished 8th in the C2 event at the 2016 Summer Olympics in Rio de Janeiro.

His partner in the C2 boat is Jonáš Kašpar.

World Cup individual podiums

References

External links 
 
 

1992 births
Czech male canoeists
Living people
Canoeists at the 2016 Summer Olympics
Olympic canoeists of the Czech Republic
Medalists at the ICF Canoe Slalom World Championships
Sportspeople from Opava